Elaphromyia transversa is a species of tephritid or fruit flies in the genus Elaphromyia of the family Tephritidae.

Distribution
New Guinea.

References

Tephritinae
Insects described in 1988
Diptera of Asia